Lakia Barber (born September 5, 1987 in Washington, DC) is an American former basketball player. She played college basketball for Monmouth University.

Basketball

High school career
Barber attended Gwynn Park High School in Brandywine, Maryland. She was four-year letterwinner in basketball at Gwynn Park High School. She helped lead her squad to a combined 91-10 record during her four seasons and won Maryland State Championships in 2003 and 2004. She also won county tournament titles in 2004 and 2005. She earned four consecutive league championship trophies and two regional titles. She posted 15.0 points and 10.0 rebounds per game as a senior, up from her 11.0/8.0 stats as a junior. She was named first-team All-Gazette and first-team all-league (3A). She was honored as Washington Post honorable mention All-Met and tabbed a McDonald's All-American nominee. She competed in the 3A/2A versus 4A All-Star Game as a senior and played in the Public vs. Private All-Star Game as well. She was also named Gwynn Park Most Valuable Player.

Collegiate career

Freshman season
Barber appeared of 27 of the team’s 28 games and shot 45-of-108 (41.7%) from the floor. She hit 20-of-30 (66.7%) free throws and pulled down 23 offensive and 22 defensive rebounds (1.7 rpg). She scored 110 points for a 4.1 points per game average. She scored career-high 14 points on 6-of-8 shooting against Navy (11/19). She tallied nine points and two steals against #9 Maryland (12/7) and scored seven points at St. Francis (N.Y.) (12/10). She contributed 11 points and five rebounds in 10 minutes at St. Francis (Pa.) (1/28), and scored 12 points in nine minutes against Wagner (2/4). She followed that up with eight points in 12 minutes at Central Connecticut State (2/6).

Sophomore season
Barber appeared in 29 games for the Hawks, making eight starts. She shot 72-of-194 (37.1%) from the field and 64-of-92 (69.6%) from the foul line. She scored 209 points on the season, averaging 7.2 points per game. She pulled down 127 rebounds while averaging 4.4 a game. She registered 14 steals, 9 blocked shots, and 16 assists for the squad. She collected 14 points while shooting seven-for-nine from the field in a win over Rider (11/17). She scored a season-high 19 points while grabbing eight rebounds and shooting 12-for-14 from the foul line against Marshall (11/23). She logged two steals, eight rebounds, and made six-out-of-seven foul shots against St. Francis [N.Y.] (12/10). She pulled down eight rebounds against Sacred Heart (1/13) and had three assists against Robert Morris (1/27). She tallied 17 points while shooting seven-for-eight from the field against Central Connecticut State (2/19). She collected a season-high ten rebounds while shooting a perfect six-for-six from the foul line in win over Fairleigh Dickinson (2/21). In March 2007, she tore her ACL in practice.

Junior season
Appeared in 30 games, averaging 7.5 points and 3.5 rebounds per game.

Professional career
She signed with Black Star Mersch prior to the 2009-2010 season. In 10 games she averaged 21.0 points and 10.5 rebounds per game.

Monmouth  statistics 
Source

Gridiron football
Barber played gridiron football for the D.C. Divas in the Women's Football Alliance from 2011 to 2013.

Personal life
She is the daughter of Mark and Patrice Barber, and the sister of Brittney Barber.

References

External links
Monmouth University player profile
Eurobasket Profile

Living people
1987 births
Monmouth Hawks women's basketball players
American women's basketball players